Elina Svitolina was the two-time defending champion, but lost in the second round to Victoria Azarenka.

Karolína Plíšková won the title, defeating Johanna Konta in the final, 6–3, 6–4.

Naomi Osaka and Simona Halep were in contention for the WTA no. 1 singles ranking at the beginning of the tournament. Osaka retained the top ranking following Halep's loss in the second round.

Seeds
The top eight seeds received a bye into the second round.

Draw

Finals

Top half

Section 1

Section 2

Bottom half

Section 3

Section 4

Qualifying

Seeds

Qualifiers

Lucky loser
  Amanda Anisimova

Qualifying draw

First qualifier

Second qualifier

Third qualifier

Fourth qualifier

Fifth qualifier

Sixth qualifier

Seventh qualifier

Eighth qualifier

References

External links
 Main draw
 Qualifying draw

Italian Open - Women's Singles
Women's Singles